Ooltewah High School (OHS) is a public high school located in Ooltewah, Tennessee, near Chattanooga. It is part of the Hamilton County Schools system.

Academics 
Ooltewah High School offers advanced placement (AP) courses and an international baccalaureate (IB) program.

Athletics 
The school competes in the Tennessee Secondary School Athletic Association (TSSAA). Its mascot is the Owl. Sports include baseball, basketball, football, girls' golf, soccer, ultimate frisbee, softball, tennis, track and field,
volleyball, lacrosse and  wrestling.

State championships 
Girls' basketball - 1975.
Softball - 1982, 1990, 1992, 2008.
Boys' track and field - 1984, 1992, 1996, 1997, 2008, 2009.
Girls' track and field - 1991, 1992, 1999.
Wrestling - 2007, 2008, 2009.

Notable alumni 
Sammy Seamster, former Middle Tennessee State University & NFL cornerback
Jacques Smith, former University of Tennessee & NFL defensive end & linebacker

2015 incident 
In December 2015 several members of the basketball team arrived in Gatlinburg, Tennessee for a tournament. On the night of December 19, several older members dunked four freshman players in a hot tub. The next night, older players began poking pool cues in four of the freshmen's rectums. Three nights later, one freshman player was assaulted in the rectum, and required emergency surgery. The following January, the school's basketball season was cancelled, and in August 2016, all three defendants were found guilty of aggravated rape and assault. The event made national news.

References

Public high schools in Tennessee
Ooltewah, Tennessee
Schools in Chattanooga, Tennessee